Condit is an unincorporated community in Delaware County, in the U.S. state of Ohio.

History
A post office called Condit was established in 1856, and remained in operation until 1952. The community was named after L. S. Condit, the proprietor of a local creamery.  Besides the post office, Condit had a station on the Cleveland, Columbus and Mount Vernon Railroad.

References

Unincorporated communities in Delaware County, Ohio
Unincorporated communities in Ohio